Fuzzy's Grub was a restaurant chain located in London, England. It opened its first Fuzzy's in Fleet Street in 2002 and was set up by Fazila Collins and Georgina Laing, also known by the nicknames Fuzzy and Grub.

The chain was primarily a takeaway restaurant specialising in roast dinners, which were served either in box containers or as a sandwich (between thick slices of bread).  The roast dinner sandwiches contained everything that was provided in the boxes, including peas and gravy.

In 2008, Fuzzy's was in danger of administration. and the chain was dissolved later in 2008.

As of December 2017 there is one restaurant using the Fuzzy's Grub name, in Houndsditch, London, England. This restaurant has no connection to the former chain.

See also
 List of restaurants in London

References

Restaurants in London
Restaurants established in 2002
2002 establishments in England